Deema Hijjawi, Arabic: ديما حجاوي (born 1977) is a Jordanian chef, writer and television presenter. She is the founder of the Deema Hijjawi Cooking Club, and is one of social media's most followed Arab chefs.

Biography 
Hijjawi is a chef, television presenter and writer. She studied Literature at Ajman University. Interested in cookery since childhood, in 2000 she founded her first catering business. In 2012, she joined the Roya TV channel, presenting on a popular morning program Dunya Ya Dunya, where she presents a live cooking segment twice a week. She is the founder of the Deema Hijjawi Cooking Club, which aims to teach the basic principles and techniques of cooking, as well as how to prepare new dishes, through intensive cooking lessons. She is a product ambassador for Unilever, Philips appliances and Knorr in the Middle East. With a strong social media presence, she is one of the most followed Arab chefs. In 2020 she was featured in Hospitality Magazine where she predicted that the popularity of virtual cooking classes would rise. She is an exponent of Jordanian and Arabic cuisine, including qatayef.

Books 

 Tasty Temptations (2009)
 Secret Ingredients (2011)
 مطبخ ديما حجاوي‎ [in English: Dima Hajjawi's Kitchen] (2014)

References

External links 

 Official TikTok
 Teeba Recipes
 Qatayef recipe

1977 births
Living people
Jordanian women writers
Jordanian women television presenters
Women chefs
Ajman University alumni